Miranda Hennessy (born 12 January in Bournemouth, Dorset) is a British stage and film actress. In 2014, she starred in Pramface and an episode of Siblings.

Biography
She went to Hutton Primary School in Hutton, Somerset, near Weston-Super-Mare, Redland High School in Bristol and Talbot Heath School in Bournemouth. She is best known for her roles in BBC's King Gary, Give Out Girls, Pramface, The Royals. She also starred in the film Reykjavik Whale Watching Massacre which was released in the United Kingdom by E1 Entertainment. She has a BA Hons from Middlesex University and went to the drama school Drama Studio London. In 2014, she guest starred in Siblings on BBC Three and Plebs. In 2015, she starred in Hoff the Record with David Hasselhoff and Plebs on ITV2. In 2018, she appeared in Inside No. 9 in the episode "To Have and to Hold" as Hannah on BBC One She appeared in Johnny English Strikes Again in October 2018. She appeared in Catch-22 (miniseries), Sherlock (TV series) and Father Brown (2013 TV series).

References

External links
 
 

1986 births
Living people
English film actresses
Actors from Dorset
English stage actresses
Alumni of the Drama Studio London
Alumni of Middlesex University